Dunay may refer to:
Dunay, an ancient Slovenian river
The Danube River
Dunay, Iran (disambiguation), places in Iran
Dunay (inhabited locality), name of several inhabited localities in Russia
Soviet training ship Dunay, a Soviet tall ship
Dunay radar, a Soviet missile defense radar

See also
 Dunaj (disambiguation)